On 20 March 2017, an Antonov An-26 of South Sudan Supreme Airlines was destroyed by fire after landing at Wau Airport, South Sudan on a domestic flight from Juba Airport.

Aircraft
The accident aircraft was an Antonov An-26, registration S9-TLZ.

Accident
The aircraft was destroyed by fire after landing at Wau Airport, South Sudan on a domestic scheduled passenger flight from Juba Airport, South Sudan. There were 40 passengers, plus five crew on board. The accident occurred at about 15:00 local time (12:00 UTC), in conditions of  visibility. The aircraft may already have been on fire when it landed. An eyewitness reported smoke coming from the tail as it was landing. Another report is that the aircraft collided with a fire engine after it had landed, and then caught fire. The left landing gear collapsed and the aircraft was destroyed by the ensuing fire. Thirty-seven passengers received various degrees of injuries, however, no death was recorded from the crash.

See also 
LATAM Peru Flight 2213, a similar collision incident that happened 5 years after this one

References

Aviation accidents and incidents in 2017
Aviation accidents and incidents in South Sudan
Accidents and incidents involving the Antonov An-26
2017 in South Sudan
March 2017 events in Africa